Phrynixus astutus is a weevil that is endemic to New Zealand. It has been found in lawns and garden beds in private gardens in Dunedin, and in two Wellington sanctuaries, Zealandia and Otari Wilsons Bush. This weevil is known to be a host for the parasitoid wasp Metaspathius kuscheli.

References 

Molytinae
Beetles of New Zealand
Beetles described in 1876